Geoff Richardson (born 7 December 1956) is an Australian former cricketer. He played 15 first-class cricket matches for Victoria between 1982 and 1985.

See also
 List of Victoria first-class cricketers

References

External links
 

1956 births
Living people
Australian cricketers
Victoria cricketers
Cricketers from Melbourne